Chasewater Watersports Centre is located within the surroundings of Chasewater Country Park and use Chasewater reservoir for watersports. The chasewater ski club offer activities such as Water skiing, Wakeboarding, Slalom skiing and Kneeboarding all year round.

See also
Barefoot skiing
Kneeboarding (towsport)
Wakeskating

External links
Chasewater Watersports Club
Chasewater Webcam

Water sports in England
Sports venues in Staffordshire
Burntwood